In 2018, championships were held across three continents to determine the best players in major cue sports, including snooker, pool, and English billiards. While these are mostly single player sports, some matches and tournaments are held as either doubles or as team events. The snooker season runs between May and April; the pool and billiards seasons run through the calendar year.

Four men's adult world championships were held in 2018, Mark Williams won the World Snooker Championship, Joshua Filler holding the WPA World Nine-ball Championship, Sourav Kothari the World Billiards Championship, and Dick Jaspers winning the UMB World Three-cushion Championship. Three women's world championships were also held, with Han Yu winning the WPA Women's World Nine-ball Championship, the World Billiards Championship being won by Emma Bonney and Ng On-yee winning the World Women's Snooker Championship.

The snooker Triple Crown featured Ronnie O'Sullivan winning the UK Championship, while the Masters was won by Mark Allen. In pool, the Mosconi Cup was won by the US team, with Skyler Woodward as the most valuable player. Peter Gilchrist won seven events in billiards, while Reanne Evans won six women's snooker events. The events below are professional and pro-am cue sports tournaments from the year of 2018, as well as select amateur snooker events used for qualification to the World Snooker Tour.

Pool
The cue sport pool encapsulates several disciplines, such as straight pool, eight-ball, and nine-ball. Joshua Filler won the WPA World Nine-ball Championship, while the World Cup of Pool was won by China. In events where there was more than one competition, (m) refers to men, (f) to female, (s) to seniors and (u21) refers to under-21 competitions.

Euro Tour
The Euro Tour is a professional nine-ball series run across Europe by the European Pocket Billiard Federation. The season featured seven events, with six tournaments for each gender.

English billiards
The English billiards season ran from August to July. Sourav Kothari and Emma Bonney won the World Billiards Championships for each gender.

World Billiards Open

Carom billiards
Three-cushion billiards competitions overseen by the Union Mondal de Billiard (UMB)

Three-Cushion World Cup
The Three-Cushion World Cup is an annual three-cushion series of tournaments hosted by the UMB. Seven events were held, with the overall winner being Frédéric Caudron.

Snooker

The World Snooker Tour season begins in July and ends in May. Mark Williams won his third World Snooker Championship by defeating John Higgins 18–16 in the final. Ng On-yee also won her third Women's World Snooker Championship with a 5–0 win over Maria Catalano in the final.

World ranking

Non-ranking

Challenge Tour

The Challenge Tour is a secondary non-professional snooker tour with events for invited players. Eight tournaments were played from the ten events in the 2018–19 season in 2018.

World Seniors Tour

The World Seniors Tour is an amateur series open to players aged 40 and over. There were four events in the 2018 World Seniors Tour. The World Seniors Championship was won by Aaron Canavan.

Women's snooker

Amateur snooker championships

References

External links
 World Pool Association Official Website
 World Billiards Official Website
 World Snooker Official Website

 
2018 sport-related lists
Cue sports by year